Claude-Adrien Nonnotte (born in Besançon, 29 July 1711; died there, 3 September 1793) was a French Jesuit controversialist, best known for his writings against Voltaire.

At nineteen he entered the Society of Jesus and preached at Amiens, Versailles, and Turin. When Voltaire began to issue his Essai sur les moeurs (1754), which the Catholic Church considered an attack on Christianity, Nonnotte published, anonymously, the Examen critique ou Réfutation du livre des moeurs; and when Voltaire finished his publication (1758), Nonnotte revised his book, which he published at Avignon (2 vols., 1762). He dealt with what he saw as historical and doctrinal errors contained in Voltaire's work. Nonnotte's work reached the sixth edition in 1774. Voltaire retorted in his Eclaircissements historiques, and the back and forth attacks continued for twenty years.

Nonnotte's publication continued to circulate, and was translated into Italian, German, Polish, and Portuguese. After the suppression of the Jesuits by king Louis XV, Nonnotte withdrew to Besançon. In 1779 he added a third volume to the Erreurs de Voltaire, namely, L'esprit de Voltaire dans ses écrits, for which he could not obtain the approval of the Paris censor. Against the Dictionnaire philosophique, in which Voltaire had recapitulated all his attacks on Christianity, Nonnotte published the Dictionnaire philosophique de la religion (Avignon, 1772), in which he replied to all the objections then brought against religion. The work was translated into Italian and German.

Towards the end of his life Nonnotte published Les philosophes des trois premiers siècles (Paris, 1789), in which he contrasted the ancient and the modern philosophers. The work was translated into German. He also wrote Lettre à un ami sur les honnêtetés littéraires (Paris, 1766), and Réponse aux Éclaircissements historiques et aux additions de Voltaire (Paris, 1774). These publications obtained for their author a eulogistic Brief from Pope Clement XIII (1768), and the congratulations of St. Alphonsus Liguori. The latter declared that he had always at hand his "golden works" in which the chief truths of the Faith were defended with learning and propriety against the objections of Voltaire and his friends. Nonnotte was also the author of L'emploi de l'argent (Avignon, 1787), translated from Maffei; Le gouvernement des paroisses (posthumous, Paris, 1802). All were published under the title Oeuvres de Nonnotte (Besançon, 1819).

Works
 1757: Examen critique ou Réfutation du livre des moeurs
 1762: The Errors of Voltaire
 1766: Lettre à un ami sur les honnêtetés littéraires
 1772: Philosophic Dictionary of Religion
 1774: Réponse aux Éclaircissements historiques et aux additions de Voltaire
 1779: The Spirit of Voltaire as shown by his writings
 1787: L'emploi de l'argent
Le gouvernement des paroisses, 1802 édition posthume
Les philosophes des trois premiers siècles de l'église, Gauthier, Besançon, 1819 édition posthume
Les erreurs de Voltaire, nouvelle édition, revue, corrigée, augmentée, avec la réponse aux éclaircissements historiques et aux additions de Voltaire, Compagnie des libraires, Amsterdam,1766, in-8°, (2),48, 536, (4),(2), 475 et (2) S.

References
 cites:
Sommervogel, Bib. de la C. de Jesus (Paris, 1894), V, 1803-7; IX, 722.

1711 births
1793 deaths
18th-century French Jesuits
French religious writers
Writers from Besançon
Voltaire
Clergy from Besançon